The Aswan Dam, or more specifically since the 1960s, the Aswan High Dam, is one of the world's largest embankment dams, which was built across the Nile in Aswan, Egypt, between 1960 and 1970. Its significance largely eclipsed the previous Aswan Low Dam initially completed in 1902 downstream. Based on the success of the Low Dam, then at its maximum utilization, construction of the High Dam became a key objective of the government following the Egyptian Revolution of 1952; with its ability to better control flooding, provide increased water storage for irrigation and generate hydroelectricity, the dam was seen as pivotal to Egypt's planned industrialization. Like the earlier implementation, the High Dam has had a significant effect on the economy and culture of Egypt.

Before the High Dam was built, even with the old dam in place, the annual flooding of the Nile during late summer had continued to pass largely unimpeded down the valley from its East African drainage basin. These floods brought high water with natural nutrients and minerals that annually enriched the fertile soil along its floodplain and delta; this predictability had made the Nile valley ideal for farming since ancient times. However, this natural flooding varied, since high-water years could destroy the whole crop, while low-water years could create widespread drought and consequently famine. Both these events had continued to occur periodically. As Egypt's population grew and technology increased, both a desire and the ability developed to completely control the flooding, and thus both protect and support farmland and its economically important cotton crop. With the greatly increased reservoir storage provided by the High Aswan Dam, the floods could be controlled and the water could be stored for later release over multiple years.

The Aswan Dam was designed by the Moscow-based Hydroproject Institute.

Construction history
The earliest recorded attempt to build a dam near Aswan was in the 11th century, when the Arab polymath and engineer Ibn al-Haytham (known as Alhazen in the West) was summoned to Egypt by the Fatimid Caliph, Al-Hakim bi-Amr Allah, to regulate the flooding of the Nile, a task requiring an early attempt at an Aswan Dam. His field work convinced him of the impracticality of this scheme.

Aswan Low Dam, 1898–1902

The British began construction of the first dam across the Nile in 1898. Construction lasted until 1902 and the dam was opened on 10 December 1902. The project was designed by Sir William Willcocks and involved several eminent engineers, including Sir Benjamin Baker and Sir John Aird, whose firm, John Aird & Co., was the main contractor.

Aswan High Dam prelude, 1954–1960

In 1952, the Greek-Egyptian engineer Adrian Daninos began to develop the plan of the new Aswan Dam. Although the Low Dam was almost overtopped in 1946, the government of King Farouk showed no interest in Daninos's plans. Instead the Nile Valley Plan by the British hydrologist Harold Edwin Hurst was favored, which proposed to store water in Sudan and Ethiopia, where evaporation is much lower. The Egyptian position changed completely after the overthrow of the monarchy, led by the Free Officers Movement including Gamal Abdel Nasser. The Free Officers were convinced that the Nile Waters had to be stored in Egypt for political reasons, and within two months, the plan of Daninos was accepted. Initially, both the United States and the USSR were interested in helping development of the dam. Complications ensued due to their rivalry during the Cold War, as well as growing intra-Arab tensions.

In 1955, Nasser was claiming to be the leader of Arab nationalism, in opposition to the traditional monarchies, especially the Hashemite Kingdom of Iraq following its signing of the 1955 Baghdad Pact. At that time the U.S. feared that communism would spread to the Middle East, and it saw Nasser as a natural leader of an anticommunist procapitalist Arab League. America and the United Kingdom offered to help finance construction of the High Dam, with a loan of $270 million, in return for Nasser's leadership in resolving the Arab-Israeli conflict. While opposed to communism, capitalism, and imperialism, Nasser identified as a tactical neutralist, and sought to work with both the U.S. and the USSR for Egyptian and Arab benefit. After the UN criticized a raid by Israel against Egyptian forces in Gaza in 1955, Nasser realized that he could not portray himself as the leader of pan-Arab nationalism if he could not defend his country militarily against Israel. In addition to his development plans, he looked to quickly modernize his military, and he turned first to the U.S. for aid.

American Secretary of State John Foster Dulles and President Dwight Eisenhower told Nasser that the U.S. would supply him with weapons only if they were used for defensive purposes and if he accepted American military personnel for supervision and training. Nasser did not accept these conditions, and consulted the USSR for support.

Although Dulles believed that Nasser was only bluffing and that the USSR would not aid Nasser, he was wrong: the USSR promised Nasser a quantity of arms in exchange for a deferred payment of Egyptian grain and cotton. On 27 September 1955, Nasser announced an arms deal, with Czechoslovakia acting as a middleman for the Soviet support. Instead of attacking Nasser for turning to the Soviets, Dulles sought to improve relations with him. In December 1955, the US and the UK pledged $56 and $14 million, respectively, toward construction of the High Aswan Dam.

Though the Czech arms deal created an incentive for the US to invest at Aswan, the UK cited the deal as a reason for repealing its promise of dam funds. Dulles was angered more by Nasser's diplomatic recognition of China, which was in direct conflict with Dulles's policy of containment of communism.

Several other factors contributed to the US deciding to withdraw its offer of funding for the dam. Dulles believed that the USSR would not fulfil its commitment of military aid. He was also irritated by Nasser's neutrality and attempts to play both sides of the Cold War. At the time, other Western allies in the Middle East, including Turkey and Iraq, were resentful that Egypt, a persistently neutral country, was being offered so much aid.

In June 1956, the Soviets offered Nasser $1.12 billion at 2% interest for the construction of the dam. On 19 July the U.S. State Department announced that American financial assistance for the High Dam was "not feasible in present circumstances."

On 26 July 1956, with wide Egyptian acclaim, Nasser announced the nationalization of the Suez Canal that included fair compensation for the former owners. Nasser planned on the revenues generated by the canal to help fund construction of the High Dam. When the Suez War broke out, the United Kingdom, France, and Israel seized the canal and the Sinai. But  pressure from the U.S. and the USSR at the United Nations and elsewhere forced them to withdraw.

In 1958, the USSR proceeded to provide support for the High Dam project.

In the 1950s, archaeologists began raising concerns that several major historical sites, including the famous temple of Abu Simbel were about to be submerged by waters collected behind the dam. A rescue operation began in 1960 under UNESCO (for details see below under Effects).

Construction and filling, 1960–1976

The Soviets also provided technicians and heavy machinery. The enormous rock and clay dam was designed by the Soviet Hydroproject Institute along with some Egyptian engineers. 25,000 Egyptian engineers and workers contributed to the construction of the dams.

On the Egyptian side, the project was led by Osman Ahmed Osman's Arab Contractors. The relatively young Osman underbid his only competitor by one-half.
 1960: Start of construction on 9 January
 1964: First dam construction stage completed, reservoir started filling
 1970: The High Dam, as-Sad al-'Aali, completed on 21 July
 1976: Reservoir reached capacity.

Specifications

It contains  of material. At maximum,  of water can pass through the dam. There are further emergency spillways for an extra , and the Toshka Canal links the reservoir to the Toshka Depression. It holds  of water.

Irrigation scheme

Due to the absence of appreciable rainfall, Egypt's agriculture depends entirely on irrigation. With irrigation, two crops per year can be produced, except for sugar cane which has a growing period of almost one year.

In the Nile valley and delta, almost  benefit from these waters producing on average 1.8 crops per year. Hence, the overall irrigation efficiency is 38/46 = 0.826 or 83%. This is a relatively high irrigation efficiency. The field irrigation efficiencies are much less, but the losses are reused downstream. This continuous reuse accounts for the high overall efficiency.

The following table shows the distribution of irrigation water over the branch canals taking off from the one main irrigation canal, the Mansuriya Canal near Giza.

* Period 1 March to 31 July. 1 feddan is 0.42 ha or about 1 acre.
* Data from the Egyptian Water Use Management Project (EWUP)

In 1995, the output of salt was higher than the influx, and Egypt's agricultural lands were desalinizing. Part of this could be due to the large number of subsurface drainage projects executed in the last decades to control the water table and soil salinity.

Drainage through subsurface drains and drainage channels is essential to prevent a deterioration of crop yields from waterlogging and soil salinization caused by irrigation. The total investment cost in agricultural drainage over 27 years from 1973 to 2002 was about $3.1 billion covering the cost of design, construction, maintenance, research and training. During this period 11 large-scale projects were implemented with financial support from World Bank and other donors.

Effects
The High Dam has resulted in protection from floods and droughts, an increase in agricultural production and employment, electricity production, and improved navigation that also benefits tourism. Conversely, the dam flooded a large area, causing the relocation of over 100,000 people. Many archaeological sites were submerged while others were relocated. The dam is blamed for coastline erosion, soil salinity, and health problems.

The assessment of the costs and benefits of the dam remains controversial decades after its completion. Not taking into account the negative environmental and social effects of the dam, its costs are thus estimated to have been recovered within only two years. One observer notes: "The impacts of the Aswan High Dam (...) have been overwhelmingly positive. Although the Dam has contributed to some environmental problems, these have proved to be significantly less severe than was generally expected, or currently believed by many people." Another observer disagreed and he recommended that the dam should be torn down. Samuel C. Florman wrote about the dam: "As a structure it is a success. But in its effect on the ecology of the Nile Basin -most of which could have been predicted- it is a failure".

Periodic floods and droughts have affected Egypt since ancient times. The dam mitigated the effects of floods, such as those in 1964, 1973, and 1988. Navigation along the river has been improved, both upstream and downstream of the dam. Sailing along the Nile is a favorite tourism activity, which is mainly done during the winter when the natural flow of the Nile would have been too low to allow navigation of cruise ships. A new fishing industry has been created around Lake Nasser, though it is struggling due to its distance from any significant markets. The annual production was about 35 000 tons in the mid-1990s. Factories for the fishing industry and packaging have been set up near the Lake.

Drought protection, agricultural production and employment

The dams also protected Egypt from the droughts in 1972–73 and 1983–87 that devastated East and West Africa. The High Dam allowed Egypt to reclaim about 2.0 million feddan (840,000 hectares) in the Nile Delta and along the Nile Valley, increasing the country's irrigated area by a third. The increase was brought about both by irrigating what used to be desert and by bringing under cultivation of  that were previously used as flood retention basins. About half a million families were settled on these new lands. In particular the area under rice and sugar cane cultivation increased. In addition, about 1 million feddan (420,000 hectares), mostly in Upper Egypt, were converted from flood irrigation with only one crop per year to perennial irrigation allowing two or more crops per year. On other previously irrigated land, yields increased because water could be made available at critical low-flow periods. For example, wheat yields in Egypt tripled between 1952 and 1991 and better availability of water contributed to this increase. Most of the 32 km3 of freshwater, or almost 40 percent of the average flow of the Nile that were previously lost to the sea every year could be put to beneficial use. While about 10 km3 of the water saved is lost due to evaporation in Lake Nasser, the amount of water available for irrigation still increased by 22 km3. Other estimates put evaporation from Lake Nasser at between 10 and 16 cubic km per year.

Electricity production

Power generation began in 1967. When the High Dam first reached peak output it produced around half of Egypt's production of electric power (about 15 percent by 1998), and it gave most Egyptian villages the use of electricity for the first time. The High Dam has also improved the efficiency and the extension of the Old Aswan Hydropower stations by regulating upstream flows.

Resettlement and compensations

Lake Nasser flooded much of lower Nubia and 100,000 to 120,000 people were resettled in Sudan and Egypt.

In Sudan, 50,000 to 70,000 Sudanese Nubians were moved from the old town of Wadi Halfa and its surrounding villages. The climate there had a regular rainy season as opposed to their previous desert habitat in which virtually no rain fell. The government developed an irrigation project, called the New Halfa Agricultural Development Scheme to grow cotton, grains, sugar cane and other crops. The Nubians were resettled in twenty five planned villages that included schools, medical facilities, and other services, including piped water and some electrification.

Housing and facilities were built for 47 village units whose relationship to each other approximated that in Old Nubia. Irrigated land was provided to grow mainly sugar cane.

In 2019–20, Egypt started to compensate the Nubians who lost their homes following the dam impoundment.

Archaeological sites

Twenty-two monuments and architectural complexes  that were threatened by flooding from Lake Nasser, including the Abu Simbel temples, were preserved by moving them to the shores of the lake under the UNESCO Nubia Campaign. Also moved were Philae, Kalabsha and Amada.

These monuments were granted to countries that helped with the works:
 The Debod temple to Madrid
 The Temple of Dendur to the Metropolitan Museum of Art of New York
 The Temple of Taffeh to the Rijksmuseum van Oudheden of Leiden
 The Temple of Ellesyia to the Museo Egizio of Turin

These items were removed to the garden area of the Sudan National Museum of Khartoum:
 The temple of Ramses II at Aksha
 The temple of Hatshepsut at Buhen
 The temple of Khnum at Kumma
 The tomb of the Nubian prince Djehuti-hotep at Debeira
 The temples of Dedwen and Sesostris III at Semna
 The granite columns from the Faras Cathedral
 A part of the paintings of the Faras Cathedral; the other part is in the National Museum of Warsaw.

The Temple of Ptah at Gerf Hussein had its free-standing section reconstructed at New Kalabsha, alongside the Temple of Kalabsha, Beit el-Wali, and the Kiosk of Qertassi.

The remaining archaeological sites, including the Buhen fort and the cemetery of Fadrus have been flooded by Lake Nasser.

Loss of sediments

Before the construction of the High Dam, the Nile deposited sediments of various particle size – consisting of fine sand, silt and clay – on fields in Upper Egypt through its annual flood, contributing to soil fertility. However, the nutrient value of the sediment has often been overestimated. 88 percent of the sediment was carried to the sea before the construction of the High Dam. The nutrient value added to the land by the sediment was only 6,000 tons of potash, 7,000 tons of phosphorus pentoxide and 17,000 tons of nitrogen. These amounts are insignificant compared to what is needed to reach the yields achieved today in Egypt's irrigation. Also, the annual spread of sediment due to the Nile floods occurred along the banks of the Nile. Areas far from the river which never received the Nile floods before are now being irrigated.

A more serious issue of trapping of sediment by the dam is that it has increased coastline erosion surrounding the Nile Delta.

Waterlogging and increase in soil salinity
During summer when evaporation was highest, the groundwater level was too deep to allow salts dissolved in the water to be pulled to the surface through capillary action. With the disappearance of the annual flood and heavy year-round irrigation, groundwater levels remained high with little fluctuation leading to waterlogging. Soil salinity also increased because the distance between the surface and the groundwater table was small enough (1–2 m depending on soil conditions and temperature) to allow water to be pulled up by evaporation so that the relatively small concentrations of salt in the groundwater accumulated on the soil surface over the years. Since most of the farmland did not have proper subsurface drainage to lower the groundwater table, salinization gradually affected crop yields. Drainage through sub-surface drains and drainage channels is essential to prevent a deterioration of crop yields from soil salinization and waterlogging. By 2003, more than 2 million hectares have been equipped with a subsurface drainage system at a cost from 1973 to 2002 of about $3.1 billion.

Health

Contrary to many predictions made prior to the Aswan High Dam construction and publications that followed, that the prevalence of schistosomiasis (bilharzia) would increase, it did not. This assumption did not take into account the extent of perennial irrigation  that was already present throughout Egypt decades before the high dam closure. By the 1950s only a small proportion of Upper Egypt had not been converted from basin (low transmission) to perennial (high transmission) irrigation. Expansion of perennial irrigation systems in Egypt did not depend on the high dam. In fact, within 15 years of the high dam closure there was solid evidence that bilharzia was declining in Upper Egypt. S. haematobium has since disappeared altogether. Suggested reasons for this include improvements in irrigation practice. In the Nile Delta, schistosomiasis had been highly endemic, with prevalence in the villages 50% or higher for almost a century before. This was a consequence of the conversion of the Delta to perennial irrigation to grow long staple cotton by the British. This has changed. Large-scale treatment programmes in the 1990s using single-dose oral medication contributed greatly to reducing the prevalence and severity of S. mansoni in the Delta.

Other effects
Sediment deposited in the reservoir is lowering the water storage capacity of Lake Nasser. The annual sediment load of the Nile is about 134 million tons. This means that the dead storage volume would be filled up after 300–500 years if the sediment accumulated at the same rate throughout the area of the lake. Obviously sediment accumulates much faster at the upper reaches of the lake, where sedimentation has already affected the live storage zone.

After construction of the dam, aquatic weeds grew much faster in the clearer water, helped by fertilizer residues. Weeds have been gradually brought under control by manual, mechanical and biological methods.

Mediterranean fishing and brackish water lake fishery declined after the dam was finished because nutrients that flowed down the Nile to the Mediterranean were trapped behind the dam. For example, the sardine catch off the Egyptian coast declined from 18,000 tons in 1962 to a mere 460 tons in 1968, but then gradually recovered to 8,590 tons in 1992. A scientific article in the mid-1990s noted that "the mismatch between low primary productivity and relatively high levels of fish production in the region still presents a puzzle to scientists."

A concern before the construction of the High Dam had been the potential drop in river-bed level downstream of the Dam as the result of erosion caused by the flow of sediment-free water.

The red-brick construction industry, which consisted of hundreds of factories that used Nile sediment deposits along the river, has also been negatively affected. Deprived of sediment, they started using the older alluvium of otherwise arable land taking out of production up to  annually, with an estimated  destroyed by 1984 when the government prohibited, "with only modest success," further excavation. According to one source, bricks are now being made from new techniques which use a sand-clay mixture and it has been argued that the mud-based brick industry would have suffered even if the dam had not been built.

Because of the lower turbidity of the water sunlight penetrates deeper in the Nile water. Because of this and the increased presence of nutrients from fertilizers in the water, more algae grow in the Nile. This in turn increases the costs of drinking water treatment. Apparently few experts had expected that water quality in the Nile would actually decrease because of the High Dam.

See also

 Closure of the Suez Canal (1967-1975)
 Energy in Egypt
 Egyptian Public Works
 List of conventional hydroelectric power stations
 List of largest dams
 List of power stations in Egypt
 Water politics in the Nile Basin

References

External links

 View the official opening of the Aswan Dam in 1971
 Aswan Dam Sixth biggest dam
 LIFE Magazine Feb. 12, 1971 Overview of problems created by Aswan Dam

Dams completed in 1970
Energy infrastructure completed in 1967
Energy infrastructure completed in 1971
Aswan
Buildings and structures in Aswan Governorate
Dams on the Nile
Rock-filled dams
Gravity dams
Dams in Egypt
Hydroelectric power stations in Egypt
Environment of Egypt
Lake Nasser
Nubia
Irrigation in Egypt
River regulation in Egypt
Egypt–Soviet Union relations
Egypt–United States relations
1970 establishments in Egypt
Energy infrastructure completed in 1902
1902 establishments in Egypt
Soviet foreign aid
Tourist attractions in Egypt
Forced migration
20th-century architecture in Egypt